Something to Shout About is a 1943 Columbia Pictures musical film directed by Gregory Ratoff. The film stars Don Ameche and Janet Blair, and was nominated for two Academy Awards.

The film's sets were designed by the art director Nicolai Remisoff.

Plot
The film takes place behind the scenes of a fictional vaudeville play. The story centers on a recently divorced woman. She decides to use her alimony settlement to produce her own show. Unfortunately her chief backer insists on starring in it. She is saved by a talented man, who puts everything on risk to replace the talentless chief backer.

Cast
 Don Ameche – Ken Douglas
 Janet Blair – Jeanie Maxwell
 Jack Oakie – Larry Martin
 William Gaxton – Willard Samson
 Cobina Wright, Jr. – Donna Davis
 Veda Ann Borg – Flo Bentley
 Cyd Charisse (billed as Lily Norwood) – Lily

Soundtrack
You'd Be So Nice To Come Home To
Written by Cole Porter
Sung by Janet Blair and Don Ameche
I Always Knew
Written by Cole Porter
Hasta Luego
Written by Cole Porter

References

External links
 
 
 
 
 

1943 films
American black-and-white films
Columbia Pictures films
Films directed by Gregory Ratoff
Films scored by Morris Stoloff
1943 musical films
American musical films
1940s English-language films
1940s American films